Comrade Abram is a 1919 silent film directed by Aleksandr Razumny.

Plot 
The film tells about a young man Abram Hersh, who takes a job at the plant, becomes an activist and grows up in the commissioner of the Soviet Army.

Starring 
 Pyotr Baksheyev		
 Dimitri Buchowetzki	
 Vera Orlova
 Polikarp Pavlov

References

External links 

1919 films
1910s Russian-language films
Russian silent films
Russian black-and-white films